Kenneth David Keele FRCP (23 March 1909 - 3 May 1987) was an English physician and president of the History of Medicine Society of the Royal Society of Medicine from 1960 to 1962.

References 

Presidents of the History of Medicine Society
Fellows of the Royal College of Physicians
20th-century English medical doctors
1909 births
1987 deaths